Gateway High School is a public high school in Aurora, Colorado, United States. It is one of five high schools in Aurora Public Schools, and the school offers a variety of Advanced Placement courses.

Gateway's student newspaper is The Gateway Medallion and the yearbook is The Olympiad.

Performing arts

Percussion:
State champions, 1994-1999, 2003-2004 (Rocky Mountain Percussion Association, Concert Class)
World champions, 1996, 1997 (Winter Guard International (WGI) Percussion Scholastic Concert World Class)

Athletics

Softball: 

 1992 6A State champions

Football:

2021 4A State finalists

Demographics

The demographic breakdown of the 1438 students enrolled in 2020–2021 was as follows:
Native American: 0.9%
Asian: 4.1%
Black: 17.5%
Hispanic: 59.5%
White: 11.8%
Native Hawaiian/Pacific Islander: 2.2%
Two or more races: 3.9%

54.3% of the students were male, and 45.7% were female. 71.2% of the students were eligible for free or reduced lunch.

Notable alumni
 Bill Ritter, 41st Governor of Colorado
 Zack Golditch, Professional football player for the Kansas City Chiefs
 Michelle Howard, Vice Chief of Naval Operations, United States Navy
 Tia Fuller, Grammy-nominated jazz musician
 Clyde Rucker, CEO of Quiznos
 David Von Drehle, journalist

References

External links

 
Aurora Public Schools (Colorado)
Public high schools in Colorado
Educational institutions established in 1973
Schools in Arapahoe County, Colorado
1973 establishments in Colorado
International Baccalaureate schools in Colorado